Shen Jiahao (born 17 May 2001) is a Chinese swimmer. He competed in the men's 100 metre butterfly event at the 2018 FINA World Swimming Championships (25 m), in Hangzhou, China.

References

External links
 

2001 births
Living people
Chinese male butterfly swimmers
Place of birth missing (living people)
Swimmers at the 2018 Summer Youth Olympics
21st-century Chinese people